Trout Lake is a lake in municipalities of East Ferris and North Bay, Nipissing District in Northeastern Ontario, Canada, approximately  east of the much larger Lake Nipissing. Trout Lake is the source of the Mattawa River and a significant body of water on a well-known historic North American voyageur (fur-trading) route. Some of the most difficult portages are found on this part of the voyageur route between Trout Lake and the end of the Mattawa River, e.g., Portage de Mauvaise Musique, located at the Talon Chute (named after explorer and voyageur Jean Talon).

Water reservoir 

The City of North Bay (population approx 54,000) draws its drinking water from Trout Lake. While the urban core of North Bay is located primarily between Trout Lake and Lake Nipissing, the city limits contain the lake's entire northern shore. Much of the lake's southern shore is located within the township of East Ferris.

Seaplane Base 

North Bay Water Aerodrome (CNH7) is a seaplane base located near the western end of the lake.

Campbell disappearance 

In October 2006, a long-time unsolved mystery of a couple who disappeared from their Trout Lake cabin in the spring of 1956 was solved. Margaret and Allen Campbell, along with their family dog, went missing on May 25, 1956 under mysterious conditions. It was believed that Mr. and Mrs. Campbell went out in their fibreglass boat from the shore, encountered trouble and presumably drowned, but search teams in 1956 were unable to find their bodies or their boat. This mystery also amplified the belief in the legend of the Trout Lake Monster.

Bays 

 Delaney Bay
 Dugas Bay
 Four Mile Bay
 Milnes Bay
 One Mile Bay

Islands 

 Camp Island
 Cedar Island
 Dave Island
 Dellview Island
 Dunn Island
 Falconbridge Island
 Fitzsimmons Island
 Hemlock Island
 Hughes Island
 Joe Island
 Little Joe Island
 Louisville Island
 Murdoch Island
 Payne Island
 Poplar Island
 Rolph Island
 Shaftesbury Island
 Sunset Island
 Three Sisters Islands
 Trout Island

Tributaries 
 Doran Creek
 Four Mile Creek
 Hogan Creek
 Lees Creek

See also
List of lakes in Ontario

References 

 
 

Landforms of North Bay, Ontario
Hudson's Bay Company trading posts
Lakes of Nipissing District